Perils of the Yukon is a 1922 American Northern silent film serial directed by Jay Marchant, J. P. McGowan and Perry N. Vekroff. This serial was presumabed to be lost, but a copy is preserved by the Belgian Cinematek in Brussels.

Cast
 William Desmond as Jack Merrill Sr. / Jack Merrill Jr.
 Laura La Plante as Olga
 Fred R. Stanton as Ivan Petroff (as Fred Stanton)
 Joseph McDermott as Hogan (as Joe McDermott)
 George A. Williams as Scott McPherson
 Mack V. Wright as Lew Scully
 Fred Kohler as Captain Whipple
 Neola May as Neewah (as Princess Neela)
 Chief Harris as Numa
 Joseph W. Girard (as Joseph Girard)
 Ruth Royce

See also
 List of film serials
 List of film serials by studio
 List of lost films

References

External links

 

1922 films
1922 adventure films
American silent serial films
American black-and-white films
Films directed by J. P. McGowan
Films directed by Perry N. Vekroff
Films directed by Jay Marchant
Northern (genre) films
Universal Pictures film serials
Films with screenplays by George H. Plympton
1920s American films
Silent adventure films